A STANAG magazine or NATO magazine is a type of detachable firearm magazine proposed by NATO in October 1980. Shortly after NATO's acceptance of the 5.56×45mm NATO rifle cartridge, Draft Standardization Agreement (STANAG) 4179 was proposed in order to allow NATO members to easily share rifle ammunition and magazines down to the individual soldier level. The U.S. M16 rifle's magazine proportions were proposed for standardization. Many NATO members, but not all, subsequently developed or purchased rifles with the ability to accept this type of magazine. However, the standard was never ratified and remains a "Draft STANAG".

Magazines
The STANAG magazine concept is only an interface, dimensional and controls (magazine latch, bolt stop, etc.) requirement. Therefore, it not only allows one type of magazine to interface with various weapon systems, but also allows STANAG magazines to be made in various configurations and capacities. The standard capacities of STANAG-compatible magazines are 20 or 30 rounds of 5.56×45mm NATO ammunition. There are also 5-, 10-, 40- and 50-round box magazines, as well as 60- and 100-round casket magazines, 90-round snail-drum magazines, and 100-round drum magazines. There has also been a 150-round drum magazine produced.

Issues and improvements

The STANAG magazine, while relatively compact compared to other types of 5.56×45mm NATO box magazines, has often been criticized for a perceived lack of durability and a tendency to malfunction unless treated with a level of care that may not be practical under combat conditions. Because STANAG 4179 is only a dimensional standard, production quality from manufacturer to manufacturer is not uniform. Magazines have been manufactured with lightweight aluminum or plastic bodies and other inexpensive materials in order to keep costs down, or to meet requirements that treat the magazine more as a disposable piece of equipment than one that is supposed to stand up to repeated combat use.

As a result, in March 2009, the U.S. military began to accept delivery of improved STANAG magazines. To increase reliability, these magazines incorporate heavier, more corrosion resistant springs and new tan-colored anti-tilt followers. In addition, many commercial magazine manufacturers now offer improved STANAG-compatible magazines. These magazines are made from high-grade stainless steel bodies, rust- and set-resistant chrome-silicon springs, and anti-tilt followers. There are also highly reliable polymer magazines, some with view windows, others are translucent.

ARDEC began development of a new magazine design in July 2013 to address feeding issues of older designs with the new M855A1 Enhanced Performance Round. It was first made public in 2014 and completed development in mid-2016 as the Enhanced Performance Magazine. The magazine uses a blue follower and a tan body which presents the rounds with a better angle to the weapon's feedway, preventing the hardened steel tip of the EPR from contacting the aluminum feed ramp of the M4 carbine, increasing mean rounds between stoppage by 300%.

Gallery

Firearms compatible with STANAG magazines

AR-15/M16 type rifles

 AAC Honey Badger PDW
 ArmaLite AR-15
 Barrett REC7
 CAR 816
 Colt M16
 Colt M4
 Colt Automatic Rifle
 Colt Canada C7 and C8
 G5 carbine
 Haenel MK 556
 Heckler & Koch HK416
 LWRC M6
 Marine Scout Sniper Rifle
 Norinco CQ
 PVAR
 R5 RGP
 Remington GPC
 Remington R-15
 Ruger SR-556
 Safir T-15, T-16 and T-17
 SIG MCX
 SIG Sauer SIG516
 SIG Sauer SIGM400
 Smith & Wesson M&P15
 SOAR
 Type 86
 Type 91
 Unified Weapon Systems, Unified Patrol Rifle
 Windham Weaponry WW-15
 Z-M Weapons LR 300
 Rock River Arms LAR-15

Non-AR-15/M16 type rifles

 Ares SCR
 Armalite AR-180B
 Beretta AR70/90
 Beretta ARX-160
 Beretta Rx4 Storm
 Bernardelli VB-SR
 Benelli MR1
 Bofors Carl Gustaf Ak 5
 Bushmaster ACR
 Bushmaster M17S
 CETME Model L
 CZ BREN 2
 Daewoo K1
 Daewoo K2
 Daewoo K3
 Daewoo K11
 Desert Tech MDR
 Diseños Casanave SC-2005
 EMERK
 FAD assault rifle
 FAMAS G2
 Fateh assault rifle
 FN F2000
 FN FNC
 FN Minimi/M249 SAW
 FN SCAR-L
 Fort Ellis XR-86
 FaB 556
 Heckler & Koch G41
 Howa Type 89
 IMBEL IA2
 IMBEL MD2
 IMI Negev
 IMI Tavor TAR-21
 IWI Tavor X95
 IWI Galil ACE N
 Kalashnikov SR-1
 Kel-Tec PLR-16
 Kel-Tec RDB
 Kel-Tec SU-16
 KH-2002
 LAPA FA-03
 Magpul PDR
 MKEK MPT
 MSAR STG 556 "E4 Model"
 MSBS Grot
 Nabi assault rifle
 Norinco QBZ-97
 Norinco Type 03 assault rifle (export models)
 Pindad SS1
 Pindad SS2
 Pindad SS3
 Robinson Armaments M-96 "Expeditionary Rifle"
 Robinson Armaments XCR
 Rung Paisarn RPS-001
 SA80
 SAR-21 (export models)
 SAR-80
 SR-88
 SIG 556
 Sterling SAR-87
 Steyr AUG (NATO variant)
 Leader T2 MK5 rifle
 Type 65
 VB Berapi LP06
 VHS
 Vulcan V18
 Type XT-97
 XM29 OICW
 Zastava M85

Manually operated rifles 
 BMS Cam rifle
 Crossfire MKI
 Mossberg MVP
 ISSC Pump Action Rifle (PAR)
 LW-S1
 POF USA ReVolt Light
 Remington Model 7615P
 Ruger American Ranch and Predator
 Troy Pump Action Rifle (PAR)
 Voere S16
 Q Mini FIX
 Aftermarket STANAG bottom metals are also available for the Remington Model 700 (modification by gunsmith required)

STANAG magazine convertible rifles

 CZ-805 BREN (through housing conversion)
 Heckler & Koch G36 (modular magazine well)
 IMI Galil (through adaptor)
 SAR 21 (through swapping lower receiver with the one from export model)
 Steyr AUG (through right hand only STANAG magazine stock assembly)
 CM901 (with 5.56 adapter block)
 Wz. 1996 Beryl (through adaptor)

Loading tools
Loading a STANAG magazine, particularly one with a large capacity and a corresponding high spring pressure pushing the rounds to the top of the magazine, can be quite difficult. A number of devices are available to make this task simpler. These are sometimes called speedloaders but are more commonly known as magazine loaders, stripper clips, spoons, or stripper clip guides. There are a wide range of both commercial and military type loading tools available for STANAG magazines. For example; draft STANAG 4181 is a type of stripper clip and guide tool proposed for standardization based on the USGI M16 rifle stripper clips and guide tools.

Gallery

Additional information

The "RAM-LINE 30-round COMBO MAG" is a uniquely notable STANAG magazine. These commercial translucent plastic magazines can be used in both AR-15 type rifles and Ruger Mini-14 type rifles.
Magnolia States Armory offers an adapter that allows the use of STANAG magazines in 5.56mm Galil rifles as well as one that works in a variety of 5.56mm AK-47 type rifles such as the Saiga, WASR3 and Norinco rifles.
While STANAG magazines are typically loaded with 5.56 mm NATO ammo, they are also used for other calibers as well.
There are also a wide range of dummy STANAG magazines in a variety of sizes, weights and colors for training purposes.

See also 
 List of AR platform cartridges
 SR-25 pattern magazine, a scaled up version of the STANAG magazine for .308 based cartridges.
 AICS-style magazine, an emerging standard for bolt-action rifle magazines.

References

Magazines (firearms)
Magazine patterns